Trip to the Moon (Spanish:"Viaje a la luna'") is a 1958 Mexican comedy film featuring Viruta and Capulina.

External links

Mexican comedy films
1958 comedy films
1950s Mexican films
1950s Spanish-language films